Simone Boilard (born July 21, 2000) is a Canadian professional racing cyclist. She signed to ride for the UCI Women's Team  for the 2019 women's road cycling season.

Major results
2022 
 8th Ronde de Mouscron

References

External links
 

2000 births
Living people
Canadian female cyclists
Place of birth missing (living people)
21st-century Canadian women